Falkenstein Castle (Oberfalkenstein) is a ruined medieval castle near Obervellach in Carinthia, Austria. It was built in the 12th century as part of a larger fortification complex comprising the preserved advanced work of Niederfalkenstein below.

See also
List of castles in Austria

Castles in Carinthia (state)

de:Burg Falkenstein (Obervellach)